Michael Worboys (born 6 April 1947) is a British mathematician and computer scientist. He is professor of spatial informatics at the School of Computing and Mathematical Sciences at the University of Greenwich, London, England.

Worboys is known for his research on the computational and mathematical foundations of Geographic Information Science (GISci) and Geographic Information Systems (GIS). In 1993 he founded the GIS Research UK (GISRUK) conference series, which is still held annually. With Matt Duckham, he wrote the well-known textbook GIS: a computing perspective. In 2010, Worboys also co-founded the open access Journal of Spatial Information Science with co-editors Matt Duckham, Jörg-Rüdiger Sack.

Biography 

Worboys completed his studies in England. He received a B.Sc. in mathematics at the University of Reading in 1968, a M.Sc. in mathematical logic at the University of Bristol in 1969 and a Ph.D. in mathematics at the University of Birmingham in 1980.

The Association for Computing Machinery awarded Worboys the title of Distinguished Scientist in 2006 and the University Consortium for Geographic Information Science (UCGIS) presented the 2008 Research Award to him. Worboys also holds honorary professorships at the University of Melbourne and the University of Edinburgh.

Mike is also a composer and sound artist, having an interest in both instrumental and electroacoustic music. He was awarded an MMus with Distinction in Composition  at Trinity Laban Conservatoire of Music and Dance, where he worked principally with Paul Newland, Sam Hayden and Gwyn Pritchard. He is currently undertaking a PhD in Music by Composition at the University of Durham, working with James Weeks and Nick Collins.

Selected works 

Worboys, Michael, and Matt Duckham (2004). GIS: a computing perspective (second edition). Boca Raton: CRC Press. .

References

External links

Mike Worboys's homepage
GISRUK Conference Series Home Page
https://www.worboys.org/about-mike

1947 births
Living people
20th-century British mathematicians
21st-century British mathematicians
British computer scientists
Academics of the University of Greenwich
Alumni of the University of Reading
Alumni of the University of Bristol
Alumni of the University of Birmingham
Geographic information scientists